Martino Benzoni (1451–1492) was an Italian sculptor.

Works

Saint Victor Maurus (San Vittore Il Moro) relief, 1460–1462, at Collegiata di San Vittore, in Muralto, Ticino, Switzerland

Italian sculptors
Italian male sculptors
1451 births
1492 deaths